Prince Bahram Mirza Sardar Mass'oud (1885 – 24 March 1916 (?)) was a Persian Prince of the Qajar Dynasty and constitutionalists, son of Mass'oud Mirza Zell-e Soltan and grandson of Nasser al-Din Shah Qajar.

He was a well-educated prince and an advocate of Persian Constitutional Revolution. In 1907, when Mohammad Ali Shah came to power, he immigrated with his father to Europe and for a while lived in Nice and Paris.

While returning to Iran, he was killed in a German torpedo attack on the Sussex, a French passenger ferry, on 24 March 1916. His death was reported in Le Figaro and Les Échos newspapers on 2 April 1916.

References
 Soltani, Shahla (2006). Aqajan Shazdeh. Tehran: Farzan Rooz. 

Qajar princes
1885 births
1916 deaths
Civilians killed in World War I